Sarah Jane Mercer (born 1974) is a British linguist. She is currently the head of the Department of English Language Teaching at the University of Graz, Austria. Her research focuses on applied linguistics, with a special focus on psycholinguistics from a Complex Dynamic Systems Theory approach.

Career 
Mercer attended the Bolton School, Bolton, Greater Manchester, United Kingdom. She obtained a Bachelor of Arts degree in European Studies (French, German & Politics) at Royal Holloway, University of London. She received a Master of Arts degree in Teaching English as a second or foreign language (TEFL) at the University of Reading and a PhD degree in Applied Linguistics at Lancaster University.

Between 1998-2015 Mercer was a Lecturer at the University of Graz. In 2013 she became the co-editor of the journal 'System'. Between 2012-2018 she became the Deputy Head of the Centre for Teaching and Learning at the University of Graz. Between 2015-2017 she was the joint co-ordinator for the Research SIG at IATEFL.

In 2012 she was awarded Habilitation at the University of Graz. The title of her submission was Emerging complexity in language learning psychology.

Research
In 2011 Towards an Understanding of Language Learner Self-Concept was published by Springer Publishing. In this book, Mercer investigates the nature and development of language and learner self-concept. The book provides a deep insights into how learners view themselves, and how these self-beliefs can develop and affect the progress of an individual’s language learning process.

In her most-cited journal article entitled Language learner self-concept: Complexity, continuity and change, published in System in 2011, Mercer investigated the nature and dynamics of self-concept in language learning. She found that self-concept is perhaps best conceived of as a complex, multilayered, multidimensional network of interrelated self-beliefs.

Publications
Mercer has published in several major journals such as System, The Modern Language Journal, TESOL Quarterly, ELT Journal, Studies in Second Language Learning and Teaching and Language Learning Journal.

Bibliography

Books
Vaupetitsch, R., Campbell, N., Mercer, S. Reitbauer, M. & Schumm, J. (Eds.) (2009). The Materials Generator: Developing Innovative Materials for Advanced Language Production. Frankfurt: Peter Lang.
Mercer, S. (2011). Towards an Understanding of Language Learner Self-Concept. Dordrecht: Springer.
Mercer, S., Ryan, S. & Williams, M. (2015). Exploring Psychology in Language Learning and Teaching. Oxford Handbooks for Language Teachers. Oxford: Oxford University Press.
Mercer, S. & Kostoulas, A. (Eds.) (2017). Teacher Psychology in SLA. Bristol: Multilingual Matters.
Mercer, S. & Dörnyei , Z. (2020). Engaging Language Learners in Contemporary Classrooms. Cambridge: Cambridge University Press.

Articles
Mercer, S. (2008). Key concepts in ELT: Learner self-beliefs. ELT Journal 62(2): 182–183. doi:
Mercer, S. & Ryan, S. (2010). A mindset for EFL: Learners' beliefs about the role of natural talent. ELT Journal 64(4): 436–444. doi:
Mercer, S. (2011). The beliefs of two expert EFL learners. Language Learning Journal 39(1): 57 - 74.
Mercer, S. (2011). The self as a complex dynamic system. Studies in Second Language Learning and Teaching 1(1): 57–82. doi:	
Mercer, S. (2011). Understanding learner agency as a complex dynamic system. System 39(4): 427–436. doi:
Mercer, S. (2011). Language learner self-concept: Complexity, continuity and change. System 39(3): 335–346. doi:
Mercer, S. (2012). Dispelling the myth of the natural-born linguist. ELT Journal 66(1): 22 - 29.
Kostoulas, A. & Mercer, S. (2016). Fifteen years of research on self and identity in System. System, 1-7. doi:
Mercer, S., Glatz, M., Glettler, C., Lämmerer, A., Mairitsch, A., Puntschuh, S., Seidl, E., Tezak, K. & Turker, S. (2017). Moving between worlds: Teaching-based PhD identities from an ecological perspective. Journal of Adult Learning, Knowledge and Innovation. 
Kostoulas, A., Stelma, J., Mercer, S., Cameron, L. & Dawson, S. (2017). Complex systems theory as a shared discourse space for TESOL. TESOL Journal 9(2), 246–260. doi:
Mercer, S. (2017). Positive psychology in SLA: An agenda for teacher and learner wellbeing. Australian Review of Applied Linguistics, 40(2), 100-122.
Irie, K., Ryan, S., & Mercer, S. (2018). Using Q methodology to investigate pre-service EFL teachers’ mindsets about teaching competences. Studies in Second Language Learning and Teaching, 8(3), 575-598.
Talbot, K., & Mercer, S. (2019). Exploring University ESL/EFL Teachers’ Emotional Well-being and Emotional Regulation in the United States, Japan and Austria. Chinese Journal of Applied Linguistics, 41(4), 410-432.
MacIntyre, P., Gregersen, T., & Mercer, S. (2019). Setting an agenda for Positive Psychology in SLA: Theory, practice and research. The Modern Language Journal, 103(1), 262-274. doi:
MacIntyre, P., Ross, J., Talbot, K., Mercer, S., Gregersen, T., & Banga, C.-A. (2019). Stressors, personality and wellbeing among language teachers. System, 82, 26-38.

References

External links 
 

1969 births
Living people
Applied linguists
Women linguists
Linguists from the United Kingdom
Alumni of Lancaster University